ASEA is a privately owned international direct selling and multi-level marketing company founded in 2007 and headquartered in Pleasant Grove, Utah, United States. It has previously been known as Medical Immune Research, Inc. and ASEA, Inc.

History
ASEA is based on technology developed and patented by Medical Discoveries, Inc, a publicly traded company (MLSC). MDI-P was a clear, colorless liquid generated by electrolysis of a sterile saline. It contained highly reactive chlorine and oxygen species, including HOCl, OCl−, Cl−, Cl2, and O3. It was tested for its microbicidal properties and was found effective against Staphylococcus aureus, Pseudomonas aeruginosa, Legionella pneumophila, and Candida albicans, and is considered to be a very fast-acting, broad-spectrum microbicidal solution. While the primary ingredients created in the original MDI-P solution are found in the current ASEA Redox Supplement and RENU 28 products, the processes and outputs differ. All prior patents from the previous company have expired. New patents that cover the proprietary composition and production processes used to produce ASEA and RENU 28 have been filed and issued.

MDI went up for sale in 2007, and board member Verdis Norton secured investment to purchase the technology. Norton and his partners funded research to convert the product into a consumable liquid form that could be classified as a supplement. Under the company name of ASEA, they began selling the product in 2009 with an official launch in 2010. ASEA's first product was a liquid supplement initially also named ASEA, and currently known as ASEA Redox Supplement.

In 2013, ASEA, LLC moved its manufacturing operations to a 33,000 square-foot production facility, which produces 15,000 cases of ASEA Redox Supplement per week.

In 2014, RENU 28, a skin revitalization gel product, was added to its product lineup. In 2016, ASEA announced the launch of a new skincare line, RENU Advanced, consisting of four products against anti-aging.

In May 2016, ASEA launched a new skincare line, RENU Advanced. With four products bundled as a skincare system, RENU Advanced is formulated for anti-aging and is based on ASEA's flagship technology of redox signaling.

The current management consists of Chuck Funke as the CEO and Scott Aldred as the President. Currently, it has approximately 30,000 active associates.

Product

Medical doctor Harriett Hall has written about the effectiveness of the dietary supplement ASEA several times on the Science-Based Medicine website  and notes that "... there are testimonials galore; but there is no acceptable published evidence to confirm that it has any health benefits in humans."

While the primary ingredients created in the original MDI-P solution are found in the current ASEA Redox Supplement and RENU 28 products, the processes and outputs differ. All prior patents from the previous company have expired. New patents that cover the proprietary composition and production processes used to produce ASEA and RENU 28 have been filed and issued.

In 2015, ASEA partnered with BioAgilytix Labs to work in unison with their internal product teams to monitor the quality of the manufacturing process and give the scientific validity of the nature of the products. Specializing in biomarker testing, BioAfilytix validates the existence of reactive oxygen in the product. To maintain the BioAgilytix certification, ASEA provides a weekly product sampling for a scientific assay to substantiate the existence of reactive oxygen molecules in ASEA redox products and for product quality.

Effectiveness
A double blinded and placebo controlled study of 20 participants was performed to assess the effectiveness of cyclists completing time trials (TT). The abstract found that "ASEA did not improve TT performance".

ASEA has funded a study completed by Tauret Labs in which it completed a double blinded and placebo controlled study on 60 participants. It found that "Additional analysis did identify at least 5 genes that may have interesting differential expression in the test group and were not significant in placebo or control groups". However due to the small sample size and short length of the study it was noted "Confirmation of these findings may be further substantiated by a longer study time with larger cohorts of participants."

Physician Harriet Hall has reviewed the scientific literature related to the assessment of ASEA as a dietary supplement, noting that there is no acceptable published evidence to confirm that it has any health benefits in humans. The conclusions of Harriet Hall were supported by Science Based Medicine. Similar conclusions were drawn by "Does It Really Work". An updated article by Science Based Medicine in 2017 further reiterated the conclusions of Harriet Hall, stating that ASEA's "core claim makes no scientific sense", and that the company engages in "clearly deceptive" marketing practices.

Legal issues 
In its press release on 10 March 2014, the Italian Competition Authority sanctioned 3 companies "for unfair business practices". One of them was ASEA Italy which was fined €150,000. According to the Antitrust case, "consumers are proposed to purchase products through mechanisms aimed in reality at recruiting other sellers who are asked for an initial contribution or a subscription to a programme of personal purchases ... It is a distributive mechanism considered incorrect by the Consumer Code for which the consumer cannot make a contribution in exchange for the opportunity to receive compensation that is derived primarily from the introduction of other consumers into the scheme rather than from the sale or consumption of products." It alleged that the position of Asea Italy is further aggravated by the fact that the company has attributed to their products curative properties that are not adequately substantiated and certified.

References

External links

Official website

Companies based in Salt Lake City
Multi-level marketing companies based in Utah
Companies based in Salt Lake County, Utah
Privately held companies based in Utah
Multi-level marketing products
Direct sales companies
Direct marketing
Companies based in Utah County, Utah
Nutritional supplement companies of the United States
2007 establishments in Utah